Pamela Rosen Lampitt (born December 19, 1960) is an American Democratic Party politician, who has represented the 6th legislative district in the New Jersey General Assembly since taken office on January 10, 2006. She has been the Deputy Speaker in the General Assembly since 2012.

Personal life 
Lampitt was born in Natick, Massachusetts. She graduated from Johnson & Wales University with a degree in Culinary Arts and Management. Lampitt has worked at the University of Pennsylvania for 40 years and currently is the Director of Business Services, Hospitality Services. She has served on a number of steering committees on the campus, working on the Committee for Manufacturer Responsibility, which ensures university products are manufactured under fair labor standards. Lampitt and her husband, Charles, have two children, a daughter, Ilene, and a son, Andrew.

New Jersey Assembly 
Lampitt was elected to the Assembly on November 8, 2005, filling the seat of fellow Democrat Mary Previte, who did not run for re-election and had held the seat in the Assembly since 1998. In 2007, Lampitt was the lead sponsor of the Comprehensive Statewide Transfer Agreement, which allows community college students to "seamlessly" transfer credits to four-year public universities. The law has been called "the Lampitt law".

Committees 
Committee assignments for the current session are:
Education, Chair
Health, Vice-Chair
Appropriations

District 6 
Each of the 40 districts in the New Jersey Legislature has one representative in the New Jersey Senate and two members in the New Jersey General Assembly. Representatives from the 6th District for the 2022—2023 Legislative Session are:
Senator James Beach (D)
Assemblyman Louis Greenwald (D)
Assemblywoman Pamela Rosen Lampitt (D)

Electoral history

Assembly

References

External links 
Assemblyman Rosen Lampitt's legislative web page, New Jersey Legislature
New Jersey Legislature financial disclosure forms
2012 2011 2010 2009 2008 2007 2006 2005
Greenwald and Rosen Lampitt Assembly campaign website
Assembly Member Pamela R. Lampitt, Project Vote Smart

1960 births
Living people
University of Pennsylvania staff
New Jersey city council members
Democratic Party members of the New Jersey General Assembly
Politicians from Cherry Hill, New Jersey
People from Natick, Massachusetts
Women state legislators in New Jersey
Johnson & Wales University alumni
Women city councillors in New Jersey
21st-century American politicians
21st-century American women politicians